Herlihy is an Irish surname. Notable people with the surname include:

David Herlihy (1930–1991), American historian
David V. Herlihy (born 1958), American author and historian
Ed Herlihy (1909–1999), American newsreel narrator
Gavan Herlihy (born 1947), New Zealand politician
James Leo Herlihy (1927–1993), American writer
Maurice Herlihy (born 1954), American computer scientist
Patricia Herlihy (1930-2018), American historian
Thomas Herlihy (1956-2015), American politician
Tim Herlihy (born 1966), American actor and producer

Surnames of Irish origin
Surnames of British Isles origin
Anglicised Irish-language surnames